Area code 917 is a telephone area code in the North American Numbering Plan for the five boroughs of New York City: The Bronx, Brooklyn, Manhattan, Queens, and Staten Island. It is an overlay code to all numbering plan areas (NPAs) in the city, and was intended to serve cellular, pager, and voicemail applications in the city, a restriction that was subsequently ruled impermissible by the Federal Communications Commission (FCC) while grandfathering that use in New York City. Area code 917 is also assigned to landlines predominantly in Manhattan, to relieve the shortage of numbers there.

History
The original area code for all of New York City's boroughs was 212, established with the North American Numbering Plan in 1947. In 1984, the numbering plan area (NPA) was divided by splitting Brooklyn, Queens, and Staten Island into a separate numbering plan area with area code 718, reducing 212 to only Manhattan and the Bronx.

In 1990, The New York Telephone Company wanted to assign a new area code (917) to all cellphones and pagers in Manhattan and all telephone lines in the Bronx, to relieve number shortages in Manhattan, but the New York Public Service Commission denied the request.

Instead, in 1992, numbering plan area 212 was reduced to Manhattan, with the exception of Marble Hill, which, along with the Bronx, was integrated into 718. All boroughs were provided with the additional area code 917, arranged in an overlay plan.

Introduced on February 4, 1992, area code 917 was the first overlay area code in the North American Numbering Plan. When it was established, all cellphones in New York City were switched to 917, freeing up telephone numbers for additional landlines.

Shortly after the establishment of the 917 code, the FCC ruled that restriction of area codes to particular types of service was prohibited, but the instance of 917 remained grandfathered.

See also
 List of New York area codes
 List of NANP area codes

References

External links 
 North American Numbering Plan Administrator
 NANPA Area Code Map of New York
 Whitepages Area code Map
 List of exchanges from AreaCodeDownload.com, 917 Area Code

917
917
Communications in New York City
Telecommunications-related introductions in 1992
1992 establishments in New York City